Pappalardi is a surname. Notable people with the surname include:

 Felix Pappalardi (1939–1983), American music producer, songwriter, vocalist, and bassist
 Gail Collins Pappalardi (1941–2013), American songwriter, producer, and artist

Italian-language surnames